was the 8th daimyō of Odawara Domain in Sagami Province,  (modern-day Kanagawa Prefecture) in late-Edo period Japan. His courtesy title was Kaga no Kami.

Biography
Ōkubo Tadanao was the posthumous son of Ōkubo Tadanaga, son and heir of the 7th daimyō of Odawara, Ōkubo Tadazane. He was adopted by his grandfather, who, however, died in 1837, leaving him as 10th clan head and daimyō of Odawara at the age of 9.  He soon came under the influence of the faction of conservative councilors who rejected the radical reforms of his grandfather's senior councilor, Ninomiya Sontoku, eventually reversing many of the gains made. During his tenure, he was assigned additional duties in guarding the coastline of Izu Province against the incursions of foreign ships and was held responsible for the security of the American legation at Shimoda, where Townsend Harris negotiated the Treaty of Amity and Commerce in 1858.

Although married to a daughter of Shimazu Narinobu of Satsuma Domain, he died without heir in 1859.

References 
 Papinot, Edmund. (1906) Dictionnaire d'histoire et de géographie du japon. Tokyo: Librarie Sansaisha...Click link for digitized 1906 Nobiliaire du japon (2003)
 The content of much of this article was derived from that of the corresponding article on Japanese Wikipedia.

Fudai daimyo
Tadanao
1829 births
1859 deaths